Encantada-Ranchito-El Calaboz, also known as El Calaboz Rancheria in the San Pedro de Carricitos Land Grant, is a census-designated place (CDP) in Cameron County, Texas, United States. The population was 2,255 at the 2010 census. It is part of the Brownsville–Harlingen Metropolitan Statistical Area.

Geography
The Encantada-Ranchito-El Calaboz is located in southwestern Cameron County at  (26.028788, -97.634814). El Calaboz is located in the western part of the CDP, and Ranchito is in the east. La Encantada Elementary School is located in the Ranchito section of the CDP. The community is bordered by the city limits of Brownsville to the east and south and by the Rio Grande, which forms the Mexico–United States border, to the southwest.

U.S. Route 281 passes through the community.

Demographics
As of the census of 2000, there were 2,100 people, 486 households, and 445 families residing in the CDP. The population density was 503.7 people per square mile (194.4/km2). There were 567 housing units at an average density of 136.0/sq mi (52.5/km2). The racial makeup of the CDP was 88.71% White, 0.10% African American, 0.14% Native American, 0.05% Asian, 8.90% from other races, and 2.10% from two or more races. Hispanic or Latino of any race were 98.29% of the population.

There were 486 households, out of which 63.6% had children under the age of 18 living with them, 71.2% were married couples living together, 15.8% had a female householder with no husband present, and 8.4% were non-families. 7.0% of all households were made up of individuals, and 4.5% had someone living alone who was 65 years of age or older. The average household size was 4.31 and the average family size was 4.53.

In the CDP, the population was spread out, with 41.7% under the age of 18, 10.9% from 18 to 24, 28.2% from 25 to 44, 13.6% from 45 to 64, and 5.6% who were 65 years of age or older. The median age was 23 years. For every 100 females, there were 98.1 males. For every 100 females age 18 and over, there were 93.2 males.

The median income for a household in the CDP was $21,346, and the median income for a family was $23,821. Males had a median income of $19,100 versus $13,417 for females. The per capita income for the CDP was $6,944. About 36.9% of families and 41.4% of the population were below the poverty line, including 41.7% of those under age 18 and 64.6% of those age 65 or over.

Education
Encantada-Ranchito El Calaboz is served by the San Benito Consolidated Independent School District.

In addition, South Texas Independent School District operates magnet schools that serve the community.

References

Census-designated places in Cameron County, Texas
Census-designated places in Texas